This is an alphabetical list of radio stations in Panama.

Radio station

See also
 Media of Panama
 List of radio stations in Panama City

References

External links
 Panama Radio Stations An extended list of all Panamanian Radio Stations streaming online, as well as online webcams and live TV stations from Panama
 Panama Radio Stations An updated page with links to Radio Stations and local TV Stations from Panama.
 Panama Financial Radio Station Financial Radio Station.

Radio in Panama
Panama
Radio stations in Panama